Giorgio Kaniadakis (born on 5 June 1957) is a Greek-Italian physicist, whose research has focused on theoretical statistical physics. He is in the World's Top 2% Scientists, 2021. In 2001, he proposed a relativistic generalization of the Boltzmann entropy in a work entitled "Non-linear kinetics underlying generalized statistics". This work pioneered the surpassing of Boltzmann's Stosszahlansatz (molecular chaos hypothesis) within the framework of special relativity. The optimization of the Kaniadakis entropy generates Kaniadakis distribution, which is considered as one of the most viable candidate for explaining power-law tailed statistical distributions observed experimentally in a wide variety of physical natural and artificial  complex systems.

Education 
Giorgio Kaniadakis was an undergraduate and master student at Politecnico of Torino in Turin, Piedmont (Italy), where he earned his Bachelor and Master degree in Nuclear Engineering in 1981. In 1985, he received the master degree in Nuclear Physics from the University of Turin. He chose Politecnico of Torino for his doctoral studies and received a PhD in Physics in 1989.

Career and research 
After his PhD, he held research fellowships in Physics. From 1986 until 1988 he was a fellowship researcher at the Politecnico di Torino with grant of the International Center for Theoretical Physics (ICTP) of Trieste, Italy.  From 1988 until 1989 he was a fellowship researcher with grant of the National Institute of Matter Physics (INFM) for training at the Department of Physics of Politecnico di Torino. After, he was a fellowship researcher at the Politecnico di Torino, where he is now, since 1990, researcher, associated and full professor in Theoretical Physics (Department of Applied Science and Technology).

Giorgio Kaniadakis' research interests cover statistical physics. In 2001, his work resulted in a proposed statistical mechanics theory now known as Kaniadakis statistics.

See also 

 Kaniadakis statistics
 Kaniadakis distribution
 Kaniadakis κ-Exponential distribution
 Kaniadakis κ-Gaussian distribution
 Kaniadakis κ-Gamma distribution
 Kaniadakis κ-Weibull distribution
 Kaniadakis κ-Logistic distribution
 Kaniadakis κ-Erlang distribution

References

External links 
Giorgio Kaniadakis Google Scholar page
Kaniadakis Statistics on arXiv.org

Living people
1957 births
Italian physicists
People from Chania